Roger Parsons  (1926  7 January 2017) was a British chemist (electrochemist).

Biography

Parsons studied chemistry at Imperial College London, obtaining a first class bachelor's degree in 1947. His doctorate, supervised by John Bockris, was awarded the following year. In 1951 he was appointed lecturer at the University of St. Andrews in Dundee (now Dundee University), researching electrochemical kinetics and thermodynamics under Douglas Hugh Everett. In 1954, Parsons accompanied Everett to the University of Bristol, where he was appointed professor. In 1977 Parsons was appointed Directeur du Laboratoired'Electrochimie Interfaciale (director of the laboratory of interfacial electrochemistry) at the CNRS in France, moving to Southampton in 1985 before retiring in 1992.

Parsons served as editor of the Journal of Electroanalytical Chemistry and as president of the Faraday Division of the Royal Chemical Society.

Research

His work dealt with kinetics (especially hydrogen evolution in electrolysis), electrocapillarity and adsorption processes, optical methods in interfacial electrochemistry, single crystal electrode processes and the electrochemical double layer.

Awards and honours

In 1979, he was awarded the Olin Palladium Award by the Electrochemical Society. Parsons was elected to the Royal Society in 1980, and won the society's Davy Medal in 2003.

References

1926 births
2017 deaths
20th-century British chemists
Academics of the University of Bristol
Academics of the University of Southampton
Alumni of Imperial College London
French National Centre for Scientific Research scientists
English physical chemists
Fellows of the Royal Society
Research directors of the French National Centre for Scientific Research